Theodora Modestou (born 25 September 1988), known as Dora Modestou, is a Cypriot footballer. She has been a member of the Cyprus women's national team.

References

1988 births
Living people
Cypriot women's footballers
Cyprus women's international footballers
Women's association footballers not categorized by position